Navas is a Barcelona Metro station located in the Sant Andreu district of Barcelona, served by L1. It opened in 1953. The name refers to carrer Navas de Tolosa, and the station was originally called Navas de Tolosa until it adopted its current name in 1982.

Like the rest of stations in this section of L1, Navas is located under Avinguda Meridiana, and can be accessed from the street of the same name and from carrer de Biscaia.

On 21 February 2007 a deaf ONCE lottery seller was murdered in the station by being pushed on to the railtrack.

Services

See also
List of Barcelona Metro stations
Battle of Las Navas de Tolosa

References

External links

Trenscat.com

Railway stations in Spain opened in 1953
Barcelona Metro line 1 stations
Transport in Sant Andreu